Levi Ponce is an American artist noted for his public portrait murals throughout urban areas of the San Fernando Valley and Southern California.

Early life and career
Ponce was born in the Pacoima neighborhood of Los Angeles, California. Ponce attended Cleveland High School (Los Angeles) and graduated from the high school in 2005. In Ponce's high school years, Ponce joined the Reserve Officers' Training Corps. It was through the Corps, in which Ponce came across First Sergeant Rudy Sullivan, whom helped Ponce meet his potential.

He studied animation and graphic design at California State University (Northridge), and received a bachelor's degree in art. Ponce obtained a bachelor's degree in 2D art with a focus in 3D animation. Ponce was influenced by his father, Hector Ponce, a sign painter and muralist whose work appears on many storefronts in Pacoima. Ponce grew up being involved in murals as his father would paint murals, Ponce was inspired to become a muralist thanks to the reaction that his father would receive when his father was done with a mural. Ponce said "the support and respect and the praise and the recognition that locals would give him when he painted in their community was something that I didn’t see anywhere else."

In 2011, Ponce began installing murals on the sides of buildings in poorer neighborhoods of the San Fernando Valley. Ponce began to paint his first few murals in Pacoima because it is his hometown and Ponce always saw artwork in other neighborhoods, but never in Pacoima. Ponce's hometown has also influenced his artwork. Ponce uses his art to address issues that impact the Latino community such as liberty, immigration, and the environment.

Ponce is noted for his influence on what has become known as "Mural Mile", a strip of Van Nuys Boulevard in Pacoima once covered in graffiti and defaced storefronts.  Ponce began painting murals along walls facing the street, and was joined by other artists. All of the murals that Ponce painted on Van Nuys Boulevard, Ponce paid with his own money. Early in his career, Ponce paid for many of his murals.

Ponce's art sometimes take the form of a community project, as volunteers are welcome to assist with public murals. Ponce stated that when he began to paint his murals, he only had 3 volunteers, but after his tenth mural he had 70 volunteers. Ponce allows for kids, students, and strangers to help in the mural, Ponce stated upon allowing people to help "'Everybody comes together to make this happen and I think that’s my biggest accomplishment, being able to rally the troops.'" "These are our artists here in Pacoima", said Ponce, "they don't have galleries. They don't have schools or universities and museums. When I say come help paint, it's like a gift to them".

Canvas works by Ponce have been exhibited at The MACAY in Mérida, the Craft and Folk Art Museum in Los Angeles, and at California State University in Northridge. Ponce painted a mural of Judy Garland in her The Wizard of Oz (1939 film) character near Theatre West, which he still considers unfinished. Ponce received an honorary lifetime membership thanks to his mural.

In 2014, MSN Latino listed Ponce as one of "10 Latinos to Watch in 2014", describing his murals as "a truly marvelous and original way of beautifying the city, street by street".

In 2015, Ponce was commissioned to paint "Luminaries of Pantheism" for an area in Venice, California that receives over a million onlookers per year. The mural painting depicts Albert Einstein, Alan Watts, Baruch Spinoza, Terence McKenna, Carl Jung, Carl Sagan, Emily Dickinson, Nikola Tesla, Friedrich Nietzsche, Ralph Waldo Emerson, W.E.B. Du Bois, Henry David Thoreau, Elizabeth Cady Stanton, Rumi, Adi Shankara, and Lao Tzu.

A documentary of the mural entitled “Luminaries” by film director Ed Moy was awarded the Audience Award at the Marina Del Rey film festival. It features Levi Ponce, and others involved with the project.

Ponce currently works for New Deal Studios in Sylmar, as an animator. After Ponce clocks out from his day-job, Ponce begins to look at walls to find out where his next mural may go up next.

Works

References

External links
 Panorama of Soliloquy
 Panorama of Logic and Imagination

Artists from Los Angeles
21st-century American painters
21st-century American male artists
People from Pacoima, Los Angeles
Living people
American male painters
Year of birth missing (living people)